The 2017 local council election to South Ayrshire Council was held on Thursday 4 May 2017, on the same day as the 31 other local authorities in Scotland. It was the third successive Local Council election in South Ayrshire to run under the STV Electoral System. Following the election, a coalition administration was formed between the SNP, Labour and Independent councillors, despite the fact that the Conservatives remained the largest party on the council, increasing their lead over the SNP by 2 seats.

Boundary Review
The total number of seats on South Ayrshire Council was reduced as part of a Boundary Review by the Local Government Boundary Commission for Scotland from 30 to 28, with the total number of council wards remaining at 8.

The St. Leonard's area of Ayr was moved from the Ayr East ward to the Ayr West ward, with the number of council seats in Ayr East being reduced from 4 to 3.

Annbank and St. Quivox were moved from the Maybole, North Carrick and Coylton ward to the Kyle ward, with Kirkoswald, Maidens and Turnberry moving from the Maybole, North Carrick and Coylton ward to the Girvan and South Carrick ward. The number of council seats in Maybole, North Carrick and Coylton was reduced from 4 to 3.

The Conservatives were the net losers of the boundary changes, who would have otherwise had two additional councillors elected in Ayr East and Maybole, North Carrick and Coylton.

Wards

Election Result

Note: "Votes" are the first preference votes. The net gain/loss and percentage changes relate to the result of the previous Scottish local elections on 3 May 2012. This may differ from other published sources showing gain/loss relative to seats held at dissolution of Scotland's councils.

|- class="unsortable" align="centre"
!rowspan=2 align="left"|Ward
! % 
!Cllrs
! %
!Cllrs
! %
!Cllrs
! %
!Cllrs
! %
!Cllrs
!rowspan=2|TotalCllrs
|- class="unsortable" align="center"
!colspan=2 bgcolor=""| Conservative
!colspan=2 bgcolor="" | SNP
!colspan=2 bgcolor="" | Lab
!colspan=2 bgcolor="" | Ind
!colspan=2 bgcolor="" | Green
|-
|align="left"|Troon
|bgcolor="lightblue"|51.5%
|bgcolor="lightblue"|2
|30.6%
|1
|13.7%
|1
|
|
|4.2%
|0
|4
|-
|align="left"|Prestwick
|bgcolor="lightblue"|46.2%
|bgcolor="lightblue"|2
|31.3%
|1
|13.3%
|1
|9.1%
|0
|
|
|4
|-
|align="left"|Ayr North
|25.6%
|1
|bgcolor="#efe146"|43.7%
|bgcolor="#efe146"|2
|24.7%
|1
|6.1%
|0
|
|
|4
|-
|align="left"|Ayr East
|bgcolor="lightblue"|40.5%
|bgcolor="lightblue"|1
|36.5%
|1
|17.3%
|1
|5.6%
|0
|
|
|3
|-
|align="left"|Ayr West
|bgcolor="lightblue"|59.2%
|bgcolor="lightblue"|3
|23.4%
|1
|11.1%
|0
|6.2%
|0
|
|
|4
|-
|align="left"|Kyle
|bgcolor="lightblue"|43.8%
|bgcolor="lightblue"|1
|31.0%
|1
|25.3%
|1
|
|
|
|
|3
|-
|align="left"|Maybole, North Carrick & Coylton
|bgcolor="lightblue"|36.4%
|bgcolor="lightblue"|1
|27.7%
|1
|9.4%
|0
|26.5%
|1
|
|
|3
|-
|align="left"|Girvan & South Carrick
|26.7%
|1
|19.3%
|1
|9.4%
|0
|bgcolor="grey"|44.5%
|bgcolor="grey"|1
|
|
|3
|- class="unsortable" class="sortbottom" style="background:#C9C9C9"
|align="left"| Total
|43.4%
|12
|30.2%
|9
|15.2%
|5
|10.7%
|2
|0.6%
|0
|28
|-
|}

Ward Results

Troon (4 seats)
2012: 2xCon; 1xLab; 1xSNP
2017: 2xCon; 1xSNP; 1xLab
2012-2017 Change: No change

Prestwick (4 seats)
2012: 2xCon; 1xLab; 1xSNP
2017: 2xCon; 1xSNP; 1xLab
2012-2017 Change: No change

* = Incumbent councillor for Ayr East.

Ayr North (4 seats)
2012: 2xLab; 1xSNP; 1xCon
2017: 2xSNP; 1xCon; 1xLab
2012-2017 Change: SNP gain from Lab

Ayr East (3 seats)
2012: 2xSNP; 1xCon; 1xLab
2017: 1xCon; 1xSNP; 1xLab
2012-2017 Change: SNP lose seat

Ayr West (4 seats)
2012: 2xCon; 1xSNP; 1xLab
2017: 3xCon; 1xSNP
2012-2017 Change: Con gain from Lab

Kyle (3 seats)
2012: 1xSNP; 1xLab; 1xCon
2017: 1xCon; 1xSNP; 1xLab
2012-2017 Change: No change

Maybole, North Carrick and Coylton (3 seats)
2012: 1xInd; 1xLab; 1xCon; 1xSNP
2017: 1xCon; 1xSNP; 1xInd
2012-2017 Change: Lab lose seat

Girvan and South Carrick (3 seats)
2012: 1xInd; 1xSNP; 1xLab
2017: 1xInd; 1xCon; 1xSNP
2012-2017 Change: Con gain from Lab

References

2017
2017 Scottish local elections
21st century in South Ayrshire